The Son of the Red Corsair (Italian: Il figlio del Corsaro Rosso) is a 1921 Italian silent historical adventure film directed by Vitale De Stefano. It is an adaptation of the 1908 novel of the same title by Emilio Salgari. It was part of a series of Salgari adaptations by the Milan-based De Rosa Film. The story was subsequently remade as a sound film The Son of the Red Corsair in 1943.

Cast
 Rodolfo Badaloni as il figlio del corsaro rosso
 Nera Badaloni
 Anita Faraboni
 Carlo Re
 Vitale Di Stefano
 Riccardo Tassoni

References

Bibliography
 Goble, Alan. The Complete Index to Literary Sources in Film. Walter de Gruyter, 1999.

External links

1921 films
1920s Italian-language films
Films directed by Vitale De Stefano
Italian silent feature films
Italian black-and-white films
Italian historical adventure films
1920s historical adventure films
Films set in the 17th century
Films based on The Corsairs of the Antilles
Silent historical adventure films
1920s Italian films